Agelasticus is a genus of bird in the New World oriole family Icteridae. They have slender forms and thin bills. The females are responsible for building the nest, unlike some of their close relatives. The genus is found in South America.

Species
It contains the following species:

References

 
Bird genera

Taxa named by Jean Cabanis
Taxonomy articles created by Polbot